Niall Johnson (born in 1964) is an English screenwriter and film director. He is best known for his 2005 comedy film Keeping Mum.

Filmography

Film

References

External links

 

Living people
1965 births
English screenwriters
English male screenwriters